Charles McIlvenny (born 1897) was an English-born professional golfer. McIlvenny was a professional at West Middlesex and Sudbury in the early 1920s. He reached the third round of the News of the World Match Play in 1924, losing to Ernest Whitcombe, and emigrated to South Africa soon afterwards to become the professional at Port Elizabeth. He won the 1932 South African Open Championship and the South African PGA Championship four times between 1927 and 1932. He returned to England in 1930 and played in the Open Championship. In 1934 he was married in Port Elizabeth to Barbara Kingsmill Hopkins (nee Christian).

Professional wins
1927 South African PGA Championship, Transvaal Open
1929 South African PGA Championship, Transvaal Open
1931 South African PGA Championship
1932 South African Open Championship, South African PGA Championship

Results in major championships

Note: McIlvenny only played in The Open Championship.

"T" indicates a tie for a place

References

English male golfers
People from Beaconsfield
1897 births
Year of death missing